is an Australian-born Japanese rugby union player who plays as a Flanker. He currently plays for Panasonic Wild Knights in Japan's domestic Top League.

International
Cornelsen received his first call-up to his adopted country's wider training squad in April 2021, ahead of British and Irish Lions test. On 24 May, he was named in the 36-man squad for the match against the Sunwolves and tour of Scotland and Ireland. Cornelsen qualified for Japan on residency in November 2020.

References

External links

1994 births
Living people
Australian rugby union players
Rugby union flankers
Saitama Wild Knights players
Queensland Country (NRC team) players
Rugby union locks
Japanese rugby union players
Japan international rugby union players